Ramiz Bisha (born 21 November 1967) is an Albanian retired international footballer.

Club career
He played alongside compatriot Zamir Shpuza with FK Budućnost Podgorica in Yugoslavia and KF Vllaznia Shkodër in Albania.

International career
He made his debut for Albania as a second half sub for Besnik Prenga in a November 1992 FIFA World Cup qualification match against Latvia in Tirana. It remained his sole international match.

Honours
Vllaznia
Albanian Superliga: 1991–92

References

External links

1967 births
Living people
Association football midfielders
Albanian footballers
Albania international footballers
KF Vllaznia Shkodër players
FK Budućnost Podgorica players
Yugoslav First League players
Albanian expatriate footballers
Expatriate footballers in Yugoslavia
Albanian expatriate sportspeople in Yugoslavia
Kategoria Superiore players